Eli Gorenstein (born August 31, 1952) is an Israeli actor, voice actor, director, singer and cellist.

Biography
Gorenstein was born in Tel Aviv and was raised in Ramat Gan during his childhood. His maternal grandfather was philosopher Felix Weltsch. He went to New York City to study theatre and music and he holds a master's degree at Tel Aviv University. He began his career sometime during the 1960s and as a theatre actor, he made frequent on-stage collaborations with Zachi Noy. He performed at many theatres across Israel such as the Habima Theatre and the Haifa Theatre. Gorenstein often starred in theatre adaptions of Shakespeare plays as well as the musical theatre.

Gorenstein appeared as a guest on children's shows such as Rechov Sumsum (the Israeli production of Sesame Street), Parpar Nechmad and Hachaverim shel Barney (the Israeli production of Barney & Friends). He also made appearances in movies, most notably the 2007 film Israeli Intelligence and the 2018 film The Awakening of Motti Wolkenbruch. He often appeared on Zehu Ze! and performed a song on that show alongside Shlomo Gronich.

Gorenstein has also had a successful career as a voice actor. He often performed the Hebrew voices of Disney villains as well as sidekicks and supporting characters particularly during the Disney Renaissance period. His roles include Scar from The Lion King, Frollo from The Hunchback of Notre Dame, Professor Ratigan from The Great Mouse Detective, Jafar from Aladdin, Clayton from Tarzan, Sebastian from The Little Mermaid, Eeyore from the Winnie the Pooh franchise, Lumière from Beauty and the Beast, Dr. Facilier from The Princess and the Frog, Gilderoy Lockhart from Harry Potter and the Chamber of Secrets, The Wolf from Hoodwinked!, Professor Paljas from Alfred J. Kwak, Grimmel from How to Train Your Dragon: The Hidden World and many more. He has frequently collaborated with Rama Messinger, Dov Reiser and Yuval Zamir.

Gorenstein is also a singer and musician. He plays the cello and often performs songs in the style of Frank Sinatra. Known for his bass vocal range, he often performs as an opera singer at the New Israeli Opera and he performs jingles for the openings of television shows and commercials. Gorenstein participated in numerous music festivals, including the Israeli Children’s Songs Festival in 1976 in which he came second place. He also worked with the Israel Chamber Orchestra and the Israel Philharmonic Orchestra. In 2011, Gorenstein released his debut album, which features the work of artists such as Yoni Rechter, Yehonatan Geffen, Nathan Alterman, Nurit Galron and others.

Personal life
Gorenstein is married and has three children. His daughter Roni, is also an actress.

References

External links

1952 births
Living people
Israeli cellists
Israeli male film actors
Israeli male musical theatre actors
Israeli male stage actors
Israeli male television actors
Israeli male voice actors
20th-century Israeli male opera singers
Israeli people of Czech-Jewish descent
Israeli people of German-Jewish descent
20th-century Israeli Jews
21st-century Israeli Jews
Israeli theatre directors
Jewish Israeli male actors
Jewish Israeli musicians
Jewish opera singers  
Jewish singers
Male actors from Tel Aviv
Musicians from Tel Aviv
Tel Aviv University alumni
21st-century Israeli male actors
21st-century Israeli male opera singers
20th-century cellists
21st-century cellists